Alexander Garuba (born March 4, 1997) is an American soccer player who plays as a winger.

Career

College and amateur
Garuba played college soccer at Centre College in Kentucky, where he was one of the most successful players in program history. The forward was Centre’s all-time leading goal scorer and a two-time All-American, scoring 55 goals across 79 games spanning four seasons from 2015 to 2019. Garuba didn't play the 2016 season, spending a year at Georgia State University.

Garuba also played in the NPSL for Emerald Force SC in 2018, and Northern Virginia United in 2019.

Professional
In January 2020, Garuba joined NISA side Oakland Roots SC. He scored a single goal in his only appearance for the club during a season effected by the COVID-19 pandemic.

On April 23, 2021, Garuba returned to his home city, signing with USL Championship side Atlanta United 2. Following the 2021 season, Garuba was released by Atlanta United 2.

References

1997 births
Living people
American soccer players
Association football forwards
Atlanta United 2 players
National Independent Soccer Association players
National Premier Soccer League players
Oakland Roots SC players
Soccer players from Georgia (U.S. state)
USL Championship players